Fulda australis is a species of butterfly in the family Hesperiidae. It is found on Madagascar. The habitat consists of unnatural grasslands such as pastures and subarid areas.

References

Butterflies described in 1956
Astictopterini